Tahir Sinani (25 May 1964 – 29 July 2001) was a commander of the Kosovo Liberation Army in Kosovo and the National Liberation Army in Macedonia. During the Kosovo War, he was the commander of the Pashtrik Operational Zone, which comprised areas near the cities of Prizren and Gjakova (or Đakovica). Around this time, he took part in the Battle of Pashtrik. After the war, he was appointed a commander of the Third Operational Zone of the Kosovo Protection Corps, however he would also be involved in the insurgency within the Preshevë (or Preševo) valley. During the Insurgency in Macedonia, he was the commander of the 116th Brigade of the National Liberation Army.

Tahir Sinani was born in the village of Gri, near the town of Bujan within the Highlands of Gjakova, Albania on 25 May 1964. On 29 July 2001, he died due to an accidental explosion in an ammunition depot during the Insurgency in Macedonia. After the conflict, he was later buried in Prizren, Kosovo.

See also
Macedonian Conflict in 2001

References

Kosovo Liberation Army soldiers
1964 births
2001 deaths
2001 insurgency in Macedonia
People from Tropojë
Albanian nationalists